Live: The Loreley Tapes......  is a live album by Paul Rodgers of Free and Bad Company fame. It was recorded at the Rockpalast Open Air Festival, at Freilichtbühne Loreley, St. Goarshausen, Germany on 8 July 1995 and released in 1996.

Track listing 
 "Little Bit of Love"
 "Be My Friend"
 "Feel Like Makin' Love"
 "Louisiana Blues"
 "Muddy Water Blues"
 "Rolling Stone"
 "I'm Ready"
 "Wishing Well"
 "Mr. Big"
 "Fire and Water"
 "The Hunter"
 "Can't Get Enough"
 "All Right Now"

Personnel 
Paul Rodgers - vocals
Geoff Whitehorn - guitars
Jaz Lochrie - bass
Jim Copley - drums

External links
 Rockpalast Open Air Festival, Loreley 1995

Paul Rodgers albums
1996 live albums